Jenny   is a 1958 Dutch film directed by Willy van Hemert. It is a remake of the 1932 German film Eight Girls in a Boat. The movie is known as the first Dutch film in color.

The film is about Jenny, a happy 18-year-old girl who loves rowing. She gets unexpectedly pregnant by her boyfriend Ed, who then leaves her. She must make a difficult decision, but everything comes to good ends.

Cast
Ellen van Hemert	... 	Jenny Roders
Maxim Hamel	... 	Ed van Rijn
Andrea Domburg	... 	Greet
Kees Brusse	... 	Dr. Henk Ebeling
Ko van Dijk	... 	Meneer Roders (as Ko van Dijk jr.)
Teddy Schaank	   	...     Mevrouw Gonzales
Bert van der Linden	... 	Kees
Nell Knoop

External links 
 

1958 films
Dutch black-and-white films
Dutch remakes of foreign films
Remakes of German films
Dutch multilingual films
Rowing films
Films about women's sports
Dutch sports films
1950s multilingual films
1950s Dutch-language films